The Middle Branch of the Dead Diamond River is a  river in northern New Hampshire in the United States. It is a tributary of the West Branch of the Dead Diamond River, located in the Androscoggin River watershed of Maine and New Hampshire.

The Middle Branch flows for most of its length through Pittsburg, the northernmost town in New Hampshire. It flows southeast through a wide valley between  Magalloway Mountain to the south and  Diamond Ridge to the north. The river then turns south and flows parallel to the East Branch of the Dead Diamond, entering Atkinson and Gilmanton Grant and joining the West Branch less than one mile upstream from the confluence of the West Branch and the East Branch.

See also

List of rivers of New Hampshire

References

Rivers of New Hampshire
Rivers of Coös County, New Hampshire